Standard vehicle registration plates in Lithuania bear three letters and three numbers (e.g. ABC 123) in black lettering on a white background. The plates are usually of the standard EU dimensions, but can also be manufactured in the American dimensions for special import vehicles. All plates issued since 2004 also bear a blue EU identification stripe on their left-hand edge. Those issued between the restoration of Lithuanian independence in 1990 and the country's accession to the European Union in 2004 bore a similar stripe with a small Lithuanian flag in place of the flag of Europe. 

Originally the license plates had a space in the middle for stickers; the stickers were discontinued after April 2018. A coat of arms of Lithuania to the right side of the EU stripe will be added to all newly-issued license plates in October 2023.

Area designations
Until 2004 the second of the three letters in each registration mark indicated the geographical administrative area in which the vehicle had been registered, as follows:

Special types

Temporary 
Vehicles issued temporary registration in Lithuania are noted by red alphanumeric characters on white background.

Types

Vehicles imported to Lithuania or vehicles exported from Lithuania 
As of July 2022, these plates are valid for up to 30 days. They can be re-issued to the same vehicle only after it has been issued standard license plates in the meantime.

Vehicles sold by vehicle selling companies or organizations (professional or trade number plates) 

Plates issued since April 2018 start with the letter P followed boy five digits; the registration does not expire. Prior to that, numbers consisted of a letter (P or R) followed by four digits, a space and two more digits, the latter indicating the year of expiration.

Diplomatic Corps 

Reserved and used by diplomatic corps. Plates have a green background and white characters; they do not have blue sidebar on the left side. The numbers are made up of six digits, grouped 01 3 123, with the first two digits denoting the embassy or other diplomatic or consular representation:

Taxicabs 

Taxicabs have plates with white background and black text. The first letter is "T" (corresponds to the first letter of the word "taksi" in Lithuanian) and is followed by five numbers.

Before the 3rd of April, 2018, taxi plates had a yellow background and black text, with the same number scheme. These plates continued to be valid and registration centers issued these plates beyond April 3, 2018, until stocks were exhausted.

Military transport 

Military transportation has black background and white text registration plates. They do not have the side-field, only the flag.

Vintage cars 

Plates for vintage cars have been issued since July 1, 2014. Originally these plates had white characters on a brown background, which was changed to black on white as of April 3, 2018. They start with the letter H, followed by five digits (four for motorcycles).

Technical check sticker 

The registration plate has a special spot, usually between the letters and numbers but occasionally to the left of the letters, to attach a sticker certifying the compulsory periodic technical inspection to check for compliance with safety/emissions standards. The sticker is no longer compulsory from 2015.

Confusion with Swedish plates

Lithuanian standard plates are almost identical to Swedish standard plates. The Stockholm congestion tax system uses automatic number plate recognition to identify plates, and this system can not distinguish between Swedish and Lithuanian plates. Initially, non-Swedish cars did not have to pay this tax, but a Swedish owner will be charged if there is one with same number, which is likely. Even after the application of this tax to foreign cars, the problem persists; the Swedish owner of a number, not the actual Lithuanian owner, will be charged. The false tax will be cancelled after a manual check if the owner complains. Swedish taxes must be paid on time anyway and will be refunded if there is an error.

External links
 
 State Enterprise "Regitra", the administrative branch of the government in charge of vehicle registrations, vehicle operator licensing and technical inspections (in English and Lithuanian)

Lithuania
Road transport in Lithuania
Lithuania transport-related lists
 Registration plates